Thor is the nickname of an Atlantic walrus (Odobenus rosmarus) first spotted in the Netherlands in November 2022. 

Thor is a male walrus at least three years old and estimated to weigh around 0.75 tonnes.

Thor was originally sighted on 6 November 2022, first in Petten, North Holland, then Neeltje Jans island, Zeeland, and subsequently travelled along the north coast of France to Brittany. In December 2022, Thor was spotted at Calshot, Hampshire and then in Scarborough harbour, North Yorkshire on New Year's Eve. On 2 January 2023 Thor appeared in Blyth, Northumberland.

On 24 February 2023 British Divers Marine Life Rescue reported that Thor had been seen in Iceland.

Response 
Whilst Thor was in Calshot, the British Divers Marine Life Rescue issued warnings to the public to not get too close to the walrus and kept a cordon up to allow him to rest.

Thor again appeared on New Years Eve 2022 in Scarborough, North Yorkshire. British Divers Marine Life Rescue maintained a cordon through the night and the daytime until 4.20pm when he departed. Scarborough's New Year fireworks were cancelled after concerns arose after Marine Mammal Medics witnessed him becoming stressed at flashing lights from vehicles. Scarborough Borough Council leader Steve Siddons said "the welfare of the walrus has to take precedence".

Em Mayman, Yorkshire & Lincolnshire Assistant Coordinator for British Divers Marine Life Rescue praised the decision made to cancel the fireworks as a big step forward for animal welfare.

References 

Blyth, Northumberland
Brittany
Hampshire
Individual animals in England
Individual animals in France
Individual animals in the Netherlands
Scarborough, North Yorkshire
Wayward walruses
Individual walruses